Four ships of the French Navy have bourne the name of Mutin ("mutinous", or "joker"):

Ships 
 , a 14-gun cutter, lead ship of her class.
 , a 4-gun cutter.
 , a  school cutter.
 , a school cutter of the French Navy presently in service.

See also

Citations

References
Demerliac, Alain (1996) La Marine De Louis XVI: Nomenclature Des Navires Français De 1774 À 1792. (Nice: Éditions OMEGA). 
 
 

French Navy ship names